The 2015 Open de Nice Côte d'Azur was a men's tennis tournament played on outdoor clay courts. It was the 31st edition of the Open de Nice Côte d'Azur and part of the ATP World Tour 250 series of the 2015 ATP World Tour. It took place at the Nice Lawn Tennis Club in Nice, France, from 17 May through 23 May 2015.

Singles main draw entrants

Seeds 

 Rankings are as of May 11, 2015.

Other entrants 
The following players received wildcards into the singles main draw:
  Maxime Hamou
  Thanasi Kokkinakis
  Lucas Pouille

The following players received entry from the qualifying draw:
  Ruben Bemelmans 
  Sam Groth 
  Gianni Mina 
  Michael Venus

The following players received entry as lucky losers:
  Quentin Halys
  Frances Tiafoe

Withdrawals 
Before the tournament
  Simone Bolelli →replaced by Dušan Lajović
  Guillermo García-López →replaced by James Duckworth
  Martin Kližan →replaced by Benoît Paire
  Thanasi Kokkinakis →replaced by Frances Tiafoe
  Diego Schwartzman →replaced by Alexandr Dolgopolov
  Gilles Simon →replaced by Quentin Halys

Retirements 
  Nick Kyrgios
  Bernard Tomic

Doubles main draw entrants

Seeds 

 Rankings are as of May 11, 2015.

Other entrants 
The following pairs received wildcards into the doubles main draw:
  Hsieh Cheng-peng /  Wang Chieh-fu
  Benoît Paire /  Lucas Pouille

Withdrawals 
Before the tournament
  Bernard Tomic

Finals

Singles 

  Dominic Thiem defeated  Leonardo Mayer, 6–7(8–10), 7–5, 7–6(7–2)

Doubles 

  Mate Pavić /  Michael Venus defeated  Jean-Julien Rojer /  Horia Tecău, 7–6(7–4), 2–6, [10–8]

References

External links 
 Official website